This article lists the prime ministers of Burundi since the formation of the post of Prime Minister of Burundi in 1961 until the present day. The office of prime minister was most recently abolished in 1998, and reinstated in 2020 with the appointment of Alain-Guillaume Bunyoni.

Counting both the Kingdom and Republic periods, a total of sixteen people have served as prime minister, and one has served as acting prime minister. Additionally, two people, Pierre Ngendandumwe and Albin Nyamoya, served on two non-consecutive occasions.

Key
Political parties

Other factions

Status

List of officeholders

Prime ministers of the Kingdom of Burundi

Prime ministers of the Republic of Burundi

Timeline

See also

 Politics of Burundi
 List of kings of Burundi
 President of Burundi
 List of presidents of Burundi
 Vice-President of Burundi
 List of colonial governors of Ruanda-Urundi
 List of colonial residents of Burundi

Notes

References

External links
World Statesmen – Burundi

Burundi
 
Government of Burundi
1961 establishments in Burundi
Prime Ministers
Prime Ministers